Farokh Maneksha Engineer  (born 25 February 1938) is an Indian former cricketer.  He played 46 Test matches for India, played first-class cricket for Bombay in India from 1959 to 1975 and for Lancashire County Cricket Club in England from 1968 to 1976. Engineer was the last from his community to play for India, as not a single Parsee male has represented the country after him.

Early life
Engineer was born into a Parsi family in Mumbai. His father Maneksha was a doctor by profession, while mother Minnie was a housewife. He studied at the Don Bosco High School in Matunga and then studied at Podar College, Matunga where Dilip Vengsarkar, Sanjay Manjrekar, and Ravi Shastri also studied and who also went on to play for their country. Engineer's love for sports came from his father who played tennis and was himself a club cricketer. His older brother, Darius, was also a good club cricketer and inspired the young Farokh to take up the sport. Engineer initially wanted to be a pilot, right from his childhood days, he was passionate about flying. He qualified for a private pilot's license at Bombay Flying Club and used to fly Piper Cherokees or Tiger Moths quite low and would often dive under bridges. His mother did not want him to be a pilot, and so he continued concentrating on his cricket. He was a mischievous kid, and once during a lecture in class he was talking to his classmate, Shashi Kapoor. His professor threw a duster at him, and to everyone's surprise, Engineer caught the duster. His brother Darius took Farokh to the East Stand of the Brabourne Stadium, where he saw Denis Compton fielding and started calling to him. Compton was impressed by him and gave him a piece of chewing gum which he saved as his prized possession for many years. His father enrolled him in Dadar Parsi Colony Sporting Club where he learnt the nuances of the game from the seniors and later became a regular member of the team.

Early domestic career
Engineer began keeping wicket at the Dadar Parsi Colony team, after being encouraged by his brother to take it up. Darius himself played for Mysore in Ranji Trophy. He spun the ball so viciously that his fingers used to bleed, this inspired young Farokh to take up the game. The wicket-keeper back then would never even try and stop the ball down the leg side. In the first match that he kept wickets, he was involved in two leg-side stumpings which was absolutely unheard of during those days. Farokh became a regular member of the club mainly due to his wicket-keeping skills. His life was simple. Farokh used to attend his college in the morning and by the afternoon, he would take a train from Dadar to Churchgate and go to the Cricket Club of India. Engineer played his debut first-class match in December 1958 for the Combined Universities side against the touring West Indies, while playing for Bombay University. The West Indies side plundered the Combined University side mainly because of two fiery pace bowlers, Wes Hall and Roy Gilchrist. Engineer scored 0 and 29 in that game. Farokh wanted to get into the Bombay team, during that time the Bombay team was the prepotent of the Domestic Teams, as most of the players were already Test Cricketers. Bombay then had Naren Tamhane, as their wicketkeeper, before Tamhane's place was usurped by Farokh Engineer, no Indian wicketkeeper had played more Tests than Tamhane (21).

Rivalry

Engineer vs. Kunderan

After the Joshi and Tamhane battle which went on until '60-61, which was the last year for both of them, Indian cricket witnessed another rivalry, between Kunderan and Engineer, both who loved batting more than keeping. Both crowd pullers, Kunderan 'hooked' them on while Engineer 'drove' them crazy. Kunderan rose to fame with a run-a-minute, 71 at Madras against the Aussies in '59-'60, playing outrageous strokes. He also scored a double century on his debut in the Ranji Trophy match for Railways against Jammu-Kashmir. Engineer rose to fame with a seven-catch haul in a Ranji match in '60-'61 (Bombay vs Delhi), equalling Limaye's '57-'58 record. Both Engineer and Kunderan were similar in the sense that they had a knack of taking difficult catches while dropping easier ones. The China war put Kunderan temporarily out of business as the team which he represented, Railways and Services were withdrawn from the competition; he just played one Ranji match. Engineer forged ahead; he even started to open. But in 1964, when England toured India, Kunderan came back following an injury to Engineer, where he had a chipped finger, and scored nearly a double century as an opener (194) and also hit a 100 and 55 to take his series tally to 525 runs. His keeping though slipped a bit. The selectors kept him out of all the three Tests against Australia in 1964, but he was not even replaced by Engineer, he was replaced by K.S. Indrajitsinhji. Engineer resumed battle with Kunderan in the 1965 series against New Zealand. Kunderan played in only one Test as an opener, with Engineer performing the role of the wicketkeeper. Kunderan's chance came again in '66-'67 against the West Indies when he blasted 79 runs with 15 fours in the first Test. Next Test he opened and hit 39 in 45 minutes before Hall yorked him. The selectors felt that his keeping was not up to the mark and in spite of Kunderan scoring 104 in 2 hrs with 4 sixes and 11 fours two days after the second Test in a tour match against the West Indies, it was Engineer who played in the next Test in Chennai. Engineer silenced the critics and the public outcry against Kunderan's exclusion by nearly scoring a century before lunch (94). He went on to score 109 and thereafter he never looked back at Kunderan, who he had left behind. The game of musical chairs between the two continued until 1966–67, when Kunderan packed his bags and settled in Scotland.

Test career 
Engineer was to make his debut in Test cricket at Mumbai in December 1960, against England led by Captain Ted Dexter. Chairman of Selectors, Lala Amarnath chose Engineer over Kunderan for his superior keeping skills. Farokh was all set to debut on his home ground, The Brabourne Stadium. On the eve of the Test match, Engineer was practising his shots against short bowling. One of Raj Singh Dungarpur's deliveries took the top edge of his bat and hit him on his right eye. Farokh was out of the Test match. Thus, Kunderan played at Bombay but scored only five runs. Engineer was fit for the second Test at Kanpur and made his debut. He scored an important 33 and played for the remainder of the series. When the side toured the West Indies next, Engineer was the first-choice wicketkeeper. He played in the first three matches before an injury forced him out of the playing eleven. He was among the few Indian Batsman who were not afraid of the fast bowling duo of Wes Hall and Charlie Griffith who tormented the Indian players during the series. When England toured India led by M. J. K. Smith, in the winter of 1963, Farokh was the first choice as the wicket-keeper, but illness kept Farokh out of the first test match in Mumbai, and Kunderan who was in the reserves, got a chance and scored a brilliant knock of 192. This helped Kunderan seal his place in the playing eleven as a wicketkeeper-batsman, who could also open the innings. With the brilliance of Kunderan, Engineer was ignored by the selectors when Australia arrived in India to play a three-Test series in 1964. It was only in March 1965, when New Zealand toured India, under John Reid, that Engineer could manage to make a comeback to the national side. This time he also decided to open the innings, in addition to keeping wicket. Soon he came to be regarded as a full-fledged opening batsman and selectors started looking around for a good partner for him at the top of the batting order. Engineer's best innings as a batsman came during the third Test of the series against the visiting West Indians at Chennai in 1967. He had not played in the first two Tests which the visitors won. The deadly Hall-Griffith combo was supported by Gary Sobers and Lance Gibbs but Engineer was not at all intimidated by these top-class performers and nearly scored a century before lunch on the opening day of the match. This knock brought Engineer back into the national side and helped him cement his place there for the next four years. During the period from 1967 until 1970, Engineer was a member of the playing eleven in all matches that India played. He opened the innings as well except during the short Test series against the touring New Zealand side in 1969 when India experimented with many young players. This was also the period when the famous spin quartet was making its impact felt for the first time in international cricket and Engineer's presence behind the stumps was a vital factor, his performances with the bat and behind the stumps during the tour of England in 1967 saw him secure a contract to play for Lancashire. He moved to Lancashire in 1968, he also stopped playing for Mumbai in Ranji Trophy, while making himself available for the national side. Engineer's short shrift with domestic cricket was not appreciated by the selectors. When the Indian side to tour the West Indies in 1971 was chosen, Merchant insisted that Engineer was not chosen because he had not played any Domestic Cricket. Pochiah Krishnamurthy of Hyderabad was the wicketkeeper during this series but it soon became evident he was not in the same league as Engineer. Hence when the squad to tour England was selected in April 1971, Engineer was included, despite Engineer informing the selectors that he would be available only for the Test matches and not for the rest of the tour because of his commitments with Lancashire. This series proved crucial for Engineer as he played two important innings in the third Test at The Oval that India won. Engineer had moved to his position in the middle order during the tour of England in 1971. He continued to bat in that position during the series at home against England led by Tony Lewis. However, in the last Test at Mumbai, he was asked to bat at the top of the order again and he responded with a career-best knock of 121 in the first innings. During the tour of England in 1974, he was one of the few batsmen to put up a fight during the second and third Tests that India lost. During the home series against the West Indies in 1974-75, there were reports in the media that Engineer would be asked to lead the side in the second Test at Delhi after captain Pataudi was ruled out and stand-in skipper Sunil Gavaskar suffered a fracture to his thumb. Engineer was also congratulated by a senior Board official on the night before the match. But some last-minute developments put paid to his hopes and it was S Venkataraghavan who went out for toss the next day. But Engineer kept his composure and got on with his job, contributing substantially with the bat in the third Test at Kolkata, where India won by 85 runs. In the next test at Chennai, Engineer was brilliant behind the stumps, diving full length to catch an edge off the bat of Viv Richards and effecting a lightning-quick stumping to remove Clive Lloyd. Unfortunately, he failed with the bat and was dismissed for a pair in the Mumbai Test, which turned out to be his final appearance in Test matches.

Lancashire

Engineer was one of the first Indians to play as a professional in county cricket. Engineer played for English County club Lancashire from 1968 to 1976, which he played alongside West Indian great Clive Lloyd.  When he made his debut, Lancashire had not won a major honour since 1950. After the 1967 tour of England, renowned cricket commentator John Arlott wanted Engineer to play for his beloved Hampshire. At the same time, Worcestershire and Somerset were also interested in Engineer, but Engineer finally decided on Lancashire for its great history and beautiful ground. By the time he left them after 1976, the team had won the Gillette Cup four times and the John Player League twice. Post-retirement, he decided to reside in Lancashire and also served as its vice-president. He got used to life in Manchester. He was provided with a house and a car to commute daily, the club also found a house for Engineer in Timperley, a suburb in South Manchester. Later, Engineer became a revered figure in Lancashire which had become his second home. Lancashire were the undisputed one-day kings in the 1970s and Engineer, became their popular talisman. His benefit match at Lancashire fetched him £26000, an astonishing sum for the era. During a county match between Derbyshire and Lancashire, Umpire Dickie Bird led both the teams off the field, at Buxton in June 1975. It was the first time in history that snow had stopped a first-class match, "Crazy country. What kind of summer is this?" said West Indies skipper Clive Lloyd as he waded through the snow. Farokh became a fan favorite in Lancashire. So much so, that once a cop stopped him for speeding on the streets of Manchester but let him off, saying: "My father would kill me if I booked you." Farokh's stay at Lancashire, was because of Old Trafford's beauty and the crowd support they received, he recollects that during his time in Lancashire, fans would come from miles to see the team play, from the Old Trafford dressing room the team could see Warwick Road railway station and before the game, they would see packed trains emptying the passengers on the platform, the players also received regular fan mails, their lockers would be stuffed full of requests for autographs and invitations to parties. The John Player Sunday League was a revolution. Farokh's favorite innings in that competition was against Glamorgan at Southport, where he scored 78*.

In popular culture
A Bollywood film titled 83 has been released in 2021 about the event of India's first world cup win, in England in 1983. The film features  Boman Irani as Engineer and is directed and produced by Kabir Khan and Anurag Kashyap respectively.

References

External links

1938 births
Living people
Indian cricketers
India Test cricketers
India One Day International cricketers
Mumbai cricketers
West Zone cricketers
Lancashire cricketers
Indian Universities cricketers
Indian Starlets cricketers
Indian cricket commentators
Cricketers at the 1975 Cricket World Cup
Recipients of the Padma Shri in sports
Cricketers from Mumbai
Parsi people from Mumbai
Parsi people
Parsees cricketers
Wicket-keepers